Willard Lloyd Rambo (March 22, 1917 – November 28, 1984) was an American politician. He served as a Democratic member of the Louisiana House of Representatives and the Louisiana State Senate.

Life and career 
Rambo attended United States Air Force Technical School and USAF Air War College. He served with the Flying Tigers during World War II.

In 1952, Rambo was elected to the Louisiana House of Representatives, succeeding Richard Elmer Walker. He served until 1960, when he was succeeded by W. K. Brown. In four years, Rambo was elected to the Louisiana State Senate, succeeding Speedy Long. He served until 1968, when he was succeeded by J. C. Gilbert.

Rambo died in November 1984, at the age of 67. He was buried in Georgetown Cemetery.

References 

1917 births
1984 deaths
Democratic Party Louisiana state senators
Democratic Party members of the Louisiana House of Representatives
20th-century American politicians
Long family
Air War College alumni
Flying Tigers